Not All [Those] Who Wander Are Lost, or similar may refer to:

 the second line of J.R.R. Tolkien's poem "The Riddle of Strider" from The Fellowship of the Ring
 Not All Who Wander Are Lost (album), by Chris Thile, 2001
 "Not All Who Wander Are Lost", a song on the 2007 album The Last Kind Words by Devildriver
Not All Those Who Wander Are Lost, a 2010 book by Steve Blank
"Not All Who Wander Are Lost", a 2017 episode of Graves (TV series)
 "Not All Who Wander Are Lost", a song on the 2021 album Chemtrails over the Country Club by Lana Del Rey